Heaven over the Marshes (Italian: Cielo sulla palude) is a 1949 Italian historical drama film directed by Augusto Genina and starring Rubi D'Alma, Michele Malaspina, Inés Orsini and Domenico Viglione Borghese. The film portrays the life of the saint Maria Goretti. Augusto Genina was awarded the Nastro d'Argento for Best Director for the film. In 2008 the film was selected to enter the list of the 100 Italian films to be saved. The film's sets were designed by Virgilio Marchi.

Cast
 Rubi D'Alma as La contessa Teneroni 
 Michele Malaspina as Il conte 
 Domenico Viglione Borghese as Il dottore 
 Inés Orsini as Maria Goretti 
 Assunta Radico as Assunta Goretti - La madre di Maria 
 Giovanni Martella as Luigi Goretti - il padre di Maria 
 Mauro Matteucci as Alessandro Serenelli 
 Francesco Tomalillo as Giovanni Serenelli - il padre di Serenelli 
 María Luisa Landín as Lucia 
 Ida Paoloni as Teresa 
 Federico Meloni as Angelo 
 Jole Savoretti as Anna 
 Giovanni Sestili as Mariano 
 Vincenzo Solfiotti as Antonio

References

Bibliography 
 Moliterno, Gino. The A to Z of Italian Cinema. Scarecrow Press, 2009.

External links 
 

1949 films
Italian historical drama films
Italian black-and-white films
1940s historical drama films
1940s Italian-language films
Films directed by Augusto Genina
Films set in Italy
Films set in 1902
Films with screenplays by Suso Cecchi d'Amico
1949 drama films
1940s Italian films